Kew Olle Nordqvist (born 1950) is a Swedish politician and former member of the Riksdag, the national legislature. A member of the Green Party, he represented Jönköping County from October 2010 to September 2014.

References

1950 births
Living people
Members of the Riksdag 2010–2014
Members of the Riksdag from the Green Party